Taur may refer to:

 A class of fictional hybrid creatures with a humanoid upper part and four-legged animal lower part
 Taur (video game), a 2020 action-strategy video game